This is a list of films that deals with topics about the 1972–1981 martial law under Ferdinand Marcos. Various filmmakers made films that directly deal with the political atmosphere, provide social commentary, or chronicle the life of Filipinos during the period. Most of the feature films circle on the struggles and human rights abuses during the oppressive state of the government at that time.

Feature films

Documentary films
This includes documentary films and docudramas.

See also
 Cinema of the Philippines
 Ferdinand Marcos
 Films depicting Latin American military dictatorships
 Martial law in the Philippines
 Martial law under Ferdinand Marcos

References 

Martial law
Films